Contrary Creek is a tributary of the North Anna River located near Mineral in Louisa County, Virginia. The creek is of rising scientific interest due to the significant amount of drainage of toxic mine waste into the creek which has caused the water to steadily redden in color and overly decreased its pH levels; this in turn has resulted in a lack of aquatic life. Further study and treatment of Contrary Creek may reveal new answers on the effects of certain pollutants in contaminated waters as well as insight into the ways to improve the prevention of similar occurrences in the future. The USGS, the U.S. Army Corps of Engineers, the National Park Service, and the DMME, Division of Mineral Resources, are among those currently investigating Contrary Creek.

See also
List of rivers of Virginia

External links 
EPA Listing
Reclamation of Toxic Mine Waste Utilizing Sewage Sludge – Contrary Creek Demonstration Project-- Addendum Report
Proceedings of the U.S. Geological Survey (USGS) Sediment Workshop, February 4–7, 1997

Rivers of Louisa County, Virginia
Rivers of Virginia